Don't Feed da Animals is the second studio album by American rapper Gorilla Zoe. It was released on March 17, 2009. The album peaked at number 8 on the US Billboard 200, number 2 on the Billboard Top R&B/Hip-Hop Albums, and number 1 on the Billboard Top Rap Albums. The album sold 29,000 copies in its first week, and 134,660 copies to date.

Critical reception

Don't Feed da Animals received mixed reviews from music critics. Steve 'Flash' Juon of RapReviews credited the album for toning down on the skits and featured guests to showcase Zoe's vocal delivery but found it lacking with more luxury rap and silliness. Juon called it "a slight improvement over [Gorilla] Zoe's debut, but his personality still tends to get lost in the mix and he sometimes seems to be a caricature of Southern rap instead of one of its stars." AllMusic editor David Jeffries said that while the album carried the usual ear-grabbing club tracks, it was kept down by the more sophomoric lyricism on tracks like "S*** on 'Em" and "Lost". Brendan Frederick of XXL said he saw some growth in Zoe's brag-rap lyricism along with introspection on the track "Lost," saying that he found his "comfort zone somewhere between singsongy rap and electro R&B, proving that this boy from the hood is finally starting to man up."

Track listing

Charts

Weekly charts

Year-end charts

References

2009 albums
Gorilla Zoe albums
Bad Boy Records albums
Albums produced by Drumma Boy
Albums produced by Kane Beatz
Albums produced by Fatboi
Albums produced by Zaytoven